

Events
September 25 – The Chevalier de Saint-Georges, the "black Mozart", loses his command and is imprisoned at Houdainville.
 Niccolò Paganini debuts as a violin virtuoso at age 11 in his birthplace of Genoa.
 Westminster Quarters first written, for the bells of a new clock at the Church of St Mary the Great, Cambridge, by Prof. Joseph Jowett, probably with Prof. John Randall or William Crotch.

Popular Music
Nehemiah Shumway – The American Harmony, including "Schenectady"
George Thomson – A Select Collection of Original Scottish Airs for the Voice

Classical Music
Jean-Jacques Beauvarlet-Charpentier – Variations on La Marseillaise
Ludwig van Beethoven – Ein Selbstgespräch, WoO 114
Domenico Cimarosa – Concerto for 2 Flutes in G major, G.1077
Muzio Clementi
3 Piano Trios, Op. 29
3 Piano Trios, Op. 32
Jan Ladislav Dussek 
6 Piano Sonatinas, Op. 19
Piano Concerto No.5, Op. 22
The Sufferings of the Queen of France, Op. 23
Joseph Haydn
String Quartets, Opp. 71 & 74 "Apponyi"
Variations in F minor
12 German Dances, Hob.IX:10
Piano Trio in G major, Hob.XV:32
Michael Haydn – Missa in honorem Sanctae Ursulae
Leopold Kozeluch – Three Piano Sonatas, Op. 38
Giovanni Battista Viotti – Violin Concerto No.26 in B-flat major
Paul Wranitzky 
Concerto for Flute in D major, Op. 24
Six String Quartets, Op. 23

Opera
Felice Alessandri – Virginia
Samuel Arnold – The Mountaineers
Thomas Attwood – Ozmyn and Daraxa
François-Adrien Boïeldieu – La fille coupable
Domenico Cimarosa – I traci amanti
Francesco Gardi – Pirro
Johann Baptist Henneberg – Die Waldmänner
Étienne Méhul – Le jeune sage et le vieux fou
Johann Friedrich Reichardt – Erwin und Elmire
Josef Seger – 8 Toccatas and Fugues
Daniel Steibelt – Roméo et Juliette

Methods and theory writings 

 Pierre Baillot – Méthode de Violon
 Joseph Frike – A Guide in Harmony
 Othon-Joseph Vandenbroek – Traité général de tous les instruments à vent
 Georg Joseph Vogler – Verbesserung der Forkel’schen Veränderungen über 'God save the King'''

Births
January 18 – William Henry Havergal, hymn-writer and composer (d. 1870)
February 14 – William Crathern, composer of sacred music (d. c.1851)
February 27 – Elisabeth Frösslind, opera singer (d. 1861)
July 22 – Eugène Walckiers, composer (died 1866)
August 21 – Peter Casper Krossing, composer (d. 1838)
September 2 – Caroline Ridderstolpe, composer (d. 1878)
December 26 – François Hünten, composer (died 1878)
date unknown – William Bartholomew, arranger and composer (died 1867)

Deaths
January 24 (bur.) – Marged ferch Ifan, harpist and wrestler (b. 1696)
March 17 – Leopold Hofmann, composer (b. 1738)
May 3 – Martin Gerbert, music writer (b. 1720)
May 7 – Pietro Nardini, composer (b. 1722)
July 26 – Alessandro Besozzi, Italian composer (born 1702)
September 10 – Marc-Antoine Désaugiers, opera composer (b. 1742)
September 14 – Benjamin Cooke, organist and composer (b. 1734)
October 21 – Johann Hartmann, composer (b. 1726)
October 25 – Giovanni Battista Ferrandini, composer (b. 1710)date unknown'' 
Philip Phile, violinist and composer (b. c.1734)
Marie-Anne-Catherine Quinault, singer and composer (b. 1695)

References

 
18th century in music
Music by year